Princess Anna Maria Maximiliane Stephania Karoline Johanna Luisa Xaveria Nepomucena Aloysia Benedicta of Saxony, Duchess of Saxony (Full German name: Prinzessin Anna Maria Maximiliane Stephania Karoline Johanna Luisa Xaveria Nepomucena Aloysia Benedicta  von Sachsen, Herzogin zu Sachsen; born 4 January 1836 in Dresden, Kingdom of Saxony; died 10 February 1859 in Naples, Kingdom of the Two Sicilies) was the seventh child and fourth eldest daughter of John of Saxony and his wife Amalie Auguste of Bavaria and a younger sister of Albert of Saxony and George of Saxony. Through her marriage to Archduke Ferdinand, Grand Prince of Tuscany, Anna was a member of the House of Habsburg-Lorraine and an Archduchess and Princess of Austria and Princess of Hungary, Croatia, Bohemia, and Tuscany. Ann died shortly before her husband succeeded his father as Grand Duke of Tuscany.

Marriage and issue

Anna married the future Ferdinand IV, Grand Duke of Tuscany, eldest son of Leopold II, Grand Duke of Tuscany and his wife Princess Maria Antonia of the Two Sicilies, on 24 November 1856 in Dresden. Anna and Ferdinand had two children:

 Archduchess Maria Antonietta Leopolda Annunziata Anna Amalia Giuseppa Giovanna Immacolata Tecla (in German Maria Antonia Leopoldine Annunziata Anna Amalia Josepha Johanna Immaculata Thekla) (Florence, 10 January 1858 – Cannes, 13 April 1883)
 Stillborn daughter (born and died 1859)

Ancestry

References

1836 births
1859 deaths
House of Wettin
Saxon princesses
Nobility from Dresden
Austrian princesses
German Roman Catholics
Albertine branch
Deaths in childbirth
Burials at San Lorenzo, Florence
Daughters of kings